Two Lakes Provincial Park  is a provincial park in Alberta, Canada, located  south of Grande Prairie,  south of Highway 666 and an additional  south on forestry roads, where 4WD is recommended for access.

Activities
The following activities are available in the park:
Camping (three campgrounds are available on Gunderson Trail, Moberly Trail and Pine Hollow, all without electrical or water hookups)
Canoeing and kayaking
Fishing and ice fishing (Brook trout)
Front country hiking ( of trails, including Gunderson trail, Moberly trail and Pine Hollow trail)
Horseback riding
Boating (power vessels on south lake only)
Wildlife watching

See also
List of provincial parks in Alberta
List of Canadian provincial parks
List of National Parks of Canada

References

External links

Municipal District of Greenview No. 16
Provincial parks of Alberta